The Kroenke Warner Center complex in the Woodland Hills neighborhood of Los Angeles, California, United States is a mixed-use complex consisting of an open-air shopping center with a proposed expansion to include restaurants, hotels and residences, along with a training facility for the Los Angeles Rams, an NFL football team. The  was assembled from a vacant shopping mall, an abandoned corporate office building, and The Village, an open-air lifestyle and retail destination (which continues to operate).

History
The Promenade was a  that opened in 1973 as part of the Kaiser Aetna master-planned commercial-retail-residential development plan for their section of the massive former Warner Ranch now known as the Warner Center. In September 2015, Westfield opened a major expansion of Westfield Topanga, called The Village, an open-air shopping destination next to the largely-inactive Promenade mall.

In December 2017, Westfield was acquired by French commercial real estate company Unibail-Rodamco, which would later be renamed Unibail-Rodamco-Westfield (URW). In 2021, when it was reported that URW would sell its commercial properties in the United States, news reports surfaced that sports owner and real estate developer Stan Kroenke was in discussions with URW about acquiring one of its properties. This was the second largest sale of a shopping center in 2022. The center will continue to operate as an open-air lifestyle and retail destination.

References

Kroenke Sports & Entertainment
Shopping malls in the San Fernando Valley
Woodland Hills, Los Angeles
2015 establishments in California
Shopping malls established in 2015
Shopping malls in Los Angeles